The Qing River is a right (southern) tributary of the Yangtze River (Chang Jiang) in Hubei province of south-central China.

Geography

Course
The Qing River Headwaters originate at Tenglong Cave (Teng Long Dong) near Lichuan City, in Hubei's southwestern corner. Its drainage area is     17,000 km², occupying large portions of the Enshi Tujia and Miao Autonomous Prefecture and Yichang Prefecture-level city.
The Qing River (Qing Jiang) confluence with the Yangtze River (Chang Jiang) is at the ancient city of Yidu in the Yichang Prefecture of Hubei.

Dams
The Qing River has three large dams on it: the Geheyan Dam, Gaobazhou Dam, and Shuibuya Dam.
The Geheyan Dam has a ship lift that can lift vessels of up to 300 tons displacement, to allow water transport upriver from the dam.  During the 1998 Yangtze River floods the dam effectively held back the Qing River (Qing Jiang) flow.

There is also the Dongping Dam on the Zhongjiang River, the main right tributary of the Qing River.

In May 2007 landslides into a reservoir on the Qiaohe River, a tributary of the Qing River, caused significant property damage.

"Qing River Gallery"
The "Qing River Gallery" (清江画廊, Qīngjiāng Huàláng) is a Hubei Provincial Scenic Area that includes a series of scenic sites along the course of the Qing River upstream from the Geheyan Dam up to the Shuibuya Salt Springs.

References

External links
 

Rivers of Hubei
Tributaries of the Yangtze River
Enshi Tujia and Miao Autonomous Prefecture
Yichang